The Anglo-Khasi War was part of the independence struggle between the Khasi people and the British Empire between the years 1829-1833. The war started with Tirot Sing's attack on a British garrison that disobeyed orders of this Khasi king to stop a road construction project through the Khasi Hills. The Khasis were defeated in this war and the British gained supremacy over these hills.

See also
 Khasi
 Tirot Sing
 Meghalaya
 North-East India
 Indian History
 British East India Company

References

External links
 North-East Notebook
 Heritage of Meghalaya

Wars involving the United Kingdom
Wars involving British India
History of Meghalaya
Indian independence movement
1829 in Asia
1830 in Asia
1831 in Asia
1832 in Asia
1833 in Asia
1829 in the United Kingdom
1830 in the British Empire
1831 in the United Kingdom
1832 in the United Kingdom
1833 in the United Kingdom
Conflicts in 1829
Conflicts in 1830
Conflicts in 1831
Conflicts in 1832
Conflicts in 1833